The 1992–93 SMU Mustangs men's basketball team represented Southern Methodist University during the 1992–93 men's college basketball season. They received the conference's automatic bid to the NCAA Tournament where they lost in the first round to BYU.

Schedule

|-
!colspan=9 style=| Southwest tournament

|-
!colspan=9 style=| 1993 NCAA tournament

References 

SMU Mustangs men's basketball seasons
SMU
SMU
SMU
SMU